Andrew Michael Kittredge (born March 17, 1990) is an American professional baseball pitcher for the Tampa Bay Rays of Major League Baseball (MLB).

Amateur career
Kittredge attended Ferris High School in Spokane, Washington. He was drafted out of high school by the Seattle Mariners in the 45th round of the 2008 Major League Baseball draft, but opted to attend the University of Washington. In 2010, he played collegiate summer baseball with the Orleans Firebirds of the Cape Cod Baseball League.

Professional career
On November 18, 2016, the Mariners traded Kittredge, Dalton Kelly, and Dylan Thompson to the Tampa Bay Rays in exchange for Richie Shaffer and Taylor Motter.

He was called up to the majors for the first time on July 17, 2017. He pitched 2.1 innings, allowing one run on five hits before being optioned back to the Triple-A Durham Bulls to make room for newly acquired Sergio Romo. Kittredge was called back up on July 26 to replace the injured Jake Odorizzi. He was sent back down a few games later but was recalled in September when rosters expanded. In 15 games, he had an ERA of 1.76 in  innings.

On September 27, 2018,  Kittredge threw a pitch at Yankees catcher Austin Romine's head following CC Sabathia hitting Jake Bauers on the hand with a pitch. Kittredge was fined an undisclosed amount and received a 3-game suspension, which was later rescinded. He finished the season appearing in 33 games, including 3 starts. He had a 7.75 ERA in  innings.

On November 2, 2018 the Rays announced that Kittredge had been DFAd and outrighted to Triple A Durham. On June 18, 2019, the Rays announced that they had selected Kittredge's contract from Triple A Durham. In 37 appearances for Tampa Bay in 2019, he recorded a 4.17 ERA.

Kittredge posted a 2.25 ERA over 8 games in 2020. He sprained his UCL while pitching against the Boston Red Sox on August 12, 2020, which ended his season. On October 30, Kittredge was outrighted off of the 40-man roster and elected free agency. On December 8, Kittredge re-signed with the Rays organization on a minor league contract. On March 15, 2021, Kittredge triggered an opt-out clause in his deal and became a free agent, but re-signed with the Rays on a new minor league contract on March 20. On March 26, Kittredge was selected to the 40-man roster.

In the first half of 2021, Kittredge pitched to a 1.47 ERA in 43 innings across 32 games. He was named to the 2021 All-Star Game on July 12.

In 2022, Kittredge pitched to a 3.15 ERA in 20 innings across 17 games. On June 10, it was announced he would undergo Tommy John surgery, ending his season.

Personal life
Kittredge married his wife, Tobey, in 2017, with whom he has a son. They live in Spokane, Washington.

References

External links

1990 births
Living people
Baseball players from Spokane, Washington
Major League Baseball pitchers
American League All-Stars
Tampa Bay Rays players
Washington Huskies baseball players
Orleans Firebirds players
Everett AquaSox players
Clinton LumberKings players
High Desert Mavericks players
Jackson Generals (Southern League) players
Adelaide Bite players
Tacoma Rainiers players
Peoria Javelinas players
Águilas Cibaeñas players
American expatriate baseball players in the Dominican Republic
Durham Bulls players
American expatriate baseball players in Australia